Both the men's and the women's field hockey competitions at the 2022 South American Games were the fourth inclusion of hockey at the South American Games. Both tournaments were held in conjunction with one another between 3 – 12 October 2022 at Centro Nacional de Hockey in Luque, Paraguay.

The top two teams in each tournament will qualify for the 2023 Pan American Games in Santiago, Chile.

Medal summary

Medal table

Medalists

Men's tournament

Preliminary round

Pool A

Pool B

Fifth to seventh place classification

Cross-over

Fifth and sixth place

Medal round

Semi-finals

Bronze medal match

Gold medal match

Final standings

Women's tournament

Preliminary round

Fixtures

Medal round

Bronze medal match

Gold medal match

Final standings

References

2022 South American Games events
South American Games
2022
Qualification tournaments for the 2023 Pan American Games
2022 South American Games